Bussey may refer to:

People
Bussey (surname)

Places
Bussey, Iowa, USA
Bussey Glacier, Antarctica
Bussey Lake, Iowa, USA

Other uses
The Bussey Institute, (1883–1994), a biological institute at Harvard University, USA
Bussey Middle School, Garland, Texas, USA